Oleśnica  is a village in the administrative district of Gmina Chodzież, within Chodzież County, Greater Poland Voivodeship, in west-central Poland.

The village has a population of 357.

People 
 Otto von Königsmarck (1815-1889), German landowner and politcian

References

Villages in Chodzież County